Dilthey is a surname. Notable people with the surname include: 

Helmut Dilthey (1894–1918), German First World War flying ace
Karl Dilthey (1839–1907) German classical scholar and archaeologist
Wilhelm Dilthey (1833–1911), German historian, psychologist, sociologist and philosopher, brother of Karl